Palazzo Caprini  was a Renaissance palazzo in Rome, Italy, in the Borgo rione between Piazza Scossacavalli and via Alessandrina (also named Borgo Nuovo). It was designed by Donato Bramante around 1510, or a few years before.

It was also known as Palazzo di Raffaello, or Raphael's House, since the artist had bought it in 1517 and lived there until his death three years later, although by then he was planning a much larger new palazzo elsewhere. In the late 16th century the building, already decayed and crumbling, underwent a total renovation and constituted the core of the much larger Palazzo dei Convertendi, and its garden house was destroyed in 1848.  The appearance of the main facade is known from an etching by Antoine Lafréry and a partial sketch attributed to Andrea Palladio.

The palace had a façade with five bays and two levels, with rustication (using stucco) on the lower floor which, as often in Rome, was let out to shops. The upper floor had windows divided by double Doric columns, surmounted by a complete entablature.  It was highly influential, providing a standard model for the integration of the rusticated ground floor with arched openings, characteristic of 15th-century Florentine palaces alla antica such as the Pitti Palace, with the classical orders.  The decorative inclusion of large rusticated voussoirs and keystone instead of a lintel over the flat top of the lower rectangular openings in the end shop fronts was also a device with a long future.  The apparent strength of a blind arched arcade with emphatic voussoirs on the rusticated ground storey gave reassuring support to the upper storey's paired Doric columns standing on rusticated piers, set against a smooth wall.  The many buildings providing variations of the design include Somerset House in London.

Notes

Sources

Summerson, John, The Classical Language of Architecture, 1980 edition, Thames and Hudson World of Art series, 
[4] Herman Grimm, Leben Michelangelo's

Buildings and structures completed in 1510
Houses completed in the 16th century
Renaissance architecture in Rome
Caprini
Donato Bramante buildings
Caprini
1510 establishments in the Papal States